Stefan Schröder (born 17 July 1981 in Schwerin) is a German team handball player. He is the World Champion of 2007 playing with the German national team. He participated on the German team that finished 4th at the 2008 European Men's Handball Championship.

Club player
Schröder won the EHF Cup Winner's Cup in 2007 with the German club HSV Hamburg.

References

External links

1981 births
Living people
German male handball players
Sportspeople from Hamburg